The Breitovo is a general purpose pig breed from Russia.

Pig breeds originating in Russia
Agriculture in Russia
Animal breeds originating in the Soviet Union